Chuave is a Trans–New Guinea language of Chimbu Province and Eastern Highlands Province, Papua New Guinea.

Chuave is spoken in Elimbari Rural LLG, Chuave District, and Lufa District, Eastern Highlands Province.

References

External links 
 

Languages of Simbu Province
Languages of Western Highlands Province
Chimbu–Wahgi languages